Humberto Megget (1926–1951) was an Uruguayan writer and poet.

Poems in Pop Culture
Some of Megget's poems have been popularized by various popular Uruguayan singers:
"You Can Drink in the Sun", performed by Luis Trochon (cassette and vinyl Ayuí / Tacuabé "From singing handwriting." 1983)
"I"; music by Claudio Lembo. Performed by the group Salitre (cassette "Salitre". Ayuí / Tacuabé, 1989).
"Now that It's All", played by Gaston Ciarlo ("The Dino") and Numa Moraes.
"I Have Wanted to Laugh Raquel", sung by Eduardo Darnauchans.
"In the Sea the Fish Are", played by Andrew Stagnaro (album "The Ivy and the Wall." 2004).

Works
New Sun Party (Montevideo, 1945)
New Sun Party (Reissue enlarged. Number, Montevideo, 1952)
New Sun Party and Other Poems (Montevideo, 1965)
Humberto Megget Collected Works (Editions of the Eastern Band, Montevideo, 1991)

20th-century Uruguayan poets
Uruguayan male poets
1926 births
1951 deaths
People from Paysandú
20th-century Uruguayan male writers